Saša Ranković (Serbian Cyrillic: Саша Ранковић; born 21 September 1979) is a Serbian professional footballer who plays as a striker.

While playing for Zeyar Shwe Myay, Ranković became the Myanmar National League top scorer with 20 goals in the 2012 season.

External links
 
 

Association football forwards
Ayeyawady United F.C. players
Expatriate footballers in Myanmar
FK Mladi Radnik players
FK Proleter Zrenjanin players
FK Smederevo players
Myanmar National League players
Sportspeople from Požarevac
Serbian expatriate footballers
Serbian First League players
Serbian footballers
Serbian SuperLiga players
1979 births
Living people
Southern Myanmar F.C. players